There have been several independence referendums in 2017, referendums on independence.

 2017 Iraqi Kurdistan independence referendum
 2017 Catalan independence referendum
 2017 Puerto Rican status referendum

See also
 Independence referendum

Independence referendum